"Curiosity killed the cat" is a proverb used to warn of the dangers of unnecessary investigation or experimentation.

Curiosity killed the cat may also refer to:
 "Curiosity killed the cat, but satisfaction brought it back", a variation of the proverb "curiosity killed the cat"

Film and television
 Curiosity Kills the Cat (film), a Chinese film
 "Curiosity Killed the Cat", a 1994 episode of 2point4 children
 "Curiosity Killed the Cat", a 1992 episode of Secret Service

Music
 Curiosity Killed the Cat, a British band
 Curiosity (Killing the Cat), the twin album of the cassette edition of The Cure's Concert: The Cure Live album
 "Curiosity Killed the Cat", a song by G.G.F.H. from the album Halloween
 "Curiosity (Killed the Cat)", a song by Guardian from the album Miracle Mile
 "Curiosity (Killed the Cat)", a 1975 song by Little River Band from the album Little River Band

Other
 Curiosity Kills the Cat?, a Japan-exclusive adventure video game released in 1998 by ASCII for the PlayStation